Tilley Nunatak is a bold, rocky outcrop 5 nautical miles (9 km) south of Hobbs Islands, projecting from the coastal ice cliffs eastward of William Scoresby Bay. Discovered in February 1936 by DI personnel on the William Scoresby and named by them for Professor C.E. Tilley, who studied the rock specimens brought back by the expedition.

See also
Tilley Bay
Uksen Island

Nunataks of Mac. Robertson Land